Psalm 20 is the 20th psalm of the Book of Psalms, beginning in English in the King James Version: "The LORD hear thee in the day of trouble". The Book of Psalms is part of the third section of the Hebrew Bible, and a book of the Christian Old Testament. In the slightly different numbering system used in the Greek Septuagint and Latin Vulgate translations of the Bible, this psalm is Psalm 19. In Latin, it is known by the incipit, "". The psalm is attributed to David. This psalm and the following one are closely related: they are both liturgical psalms: the first is an intercession, the second is a thanksgiving; in both, the king is the prominent figure.
 
Psalm 20 is used in both Jewish and Christian liturgies. It has often been set to music.

Text

Hebrew Bible version 
The following is the Hebrew text of Psalm 20:

King James Version 
 The LORD hear thee in the day of trouble; the name of the God of Jacob defend thee;
 Send thee help from the sanctuary, and strengthen thee out of Zion;
 Remember all thy offerings, and accept thy burnt sacrifice; Selah.
 Grant thee according to thine own heart, and fulfil all thy counsel.
 We will rejoice in thy salvation, and in the name of our God we will set up our banners: the LORD fulfil all thy petitions.
 Now know I that the LORD saveth his anointed; he will hear him from his holy heaven with the saving strength of his right hand.
 Some trust in chariots, and some in horses: but we will remember the name of the LORD our God.
 They are brought down and fallen: but we are risen, and stand upright.
 Save, LORD: let the king hear us when we call.

History 
In the International Critical Commentary series, Charles and Emilie Briggs suggest that it was written during the reign of Jehoshaphat.

Usage

In Jewish prayer 
The 70 words in this psalm may reference the 70 years of exile between the first and second temples, or as suggested in the Zohar, the 70 cries of pain associated with child birth. It has been inserted into daily prayer following the loss of the second temple to symbolize the somber period prior to the construction of the third temple.

It is used in Jewish prayer in several ways:

The psalm is recited daily in most communities. In Sephardic communities (as well as some Hassidic communities, including Chabad), it is omitted on any day that Tachnun is omitted. On Asheknazic communities, it is omitted only on Shabbat, Yom Tov, Rosh Chodesh, Chol Hamoed, Tisha B'Av, Hanukkah, Purim, Shushan Purim, the 14th and 15th of Adar I, and Erev Yom Kippur and Erev Passover (some communities, such as Frankfurt Am Main, omit it also on the day proceeding every Festival and the day immediately following a festival (Isru Chag)). In this context it is known as Lamenatzeiach (the first word of the psalm in Hebrew), and is recited between Ashrei and Uva Letziyon toward the end of Shacharit.  In the Italian rite, it is recited as part of long Tachnun (recited on Mondays and Thursdays), but it is never recited between Ashrei and Uva Letziyon.
Verses 2 and 10 are part of the opening paragraph of the long Tachanun recited on Mondays and Thursdays.
Verse 10 is the 11th verse of V'hu Rachum in Pesukei Dezimra, is the final verse of Yehi Kivod in Pesukei Dezimra, is found in Uva Letzion, is the second of two verses recited as an introduction at Maariv, and is part of Havdalah.
It is also considered appropriate to recite in times of stress, such as when in labor.
It is recited either at the beginning or the end of the Yom Kippur Katan services.

Book of Common Prayer 
In the Church of England's Book of Common Prayer, this psalm is appointed to be read on the morning of the fourth day of the month.

Ancient pagan version
In the 1980s, a new papyrus, known as Papyrus Amherst 63, was translated. This papyrus was discovered in the late 19th century at Luxor (ancient Thebes), and is currently hold at the Morgan Library in New York. According to Karel van der Toorn, it dates towards the 4th century BC (although the texts contained there were probably composed in the 7th century BC at the latest) and contains a sort of "pagan" and "Northen Israelite" version of Psalm 20 in aramaic (with demotic script).

Musical settings

Psalm 20 was set in a German paraphrase by Heinrich Schütz for the Becker Psalter, "Der Herr erhört dich in der Not" (The Lord will hear you in need), SWV 116. This psalm in Latin was set to music in 1688 by Michel-Richard de Lalande, as a grand motet (S.36, music lost). André Campra set one grand motet. Marc-Antoine Charpentier set around 1670 one "Exaudiat te Dominus", H.162 for soloists, double chorus, double orchestra (flutes and strings), and continuo, around 1675 one "Prière pour le Roi" H.165 for 3 voices, 2 treble instruments, and continuo. At the beginning of 1680s, he set another one, "Exaudiat pour le Roi à 4", H.180, ( H.180 a, H.180 b,  1690) for soloists, chorus, and continuo. Henry Desmarest set one grand motet "Exaudiat te Dominus".

References

External links

 
 
  in Hebrew and English - Mechon-mamre
 Text of Psalm 20 according to the 1928 Psalter
 For the leader. A psalm of David. / The LORD answer you in time of distress; / the name of the God of Jacob defend you! text and footnotes, usccb.org United States Conference of Catholic Bishops
 Psalm 20:1 introduction and text, biblestudytools.com
 Psalm 20 – The LORD Saves His Anointed enduringword.com
 Psalm 20 / Refrain: We will call on the name of the Lord our God. Church of England
 Psalm 20 at biblegateway.com
 Hymns for Psalm 20 hymnary.org

020
Siddur of Orthodox Judaism
Works attributed to David